Minervarya mysorensis (Mysore frog) is a species of frog that is endemic to the Western Ghats, India. It is only known from its type locality, Jog in Shimoga district, Karnataka state.

References

mysorensis
Frogs of India
Endemic fauna of the Western Ghats
Taxa named by C. R. Narayan Rao
Amphibians described in 1922
Taxobox binomials not recognized by IUCN